The half-black bumblebee (Bombus vagans) is a small bumblebee with a wide distribution in North America, its range extending from Ontario to Nova Scotia and southward to Georgia.

Description
Bombus vagans is a common species of bumblebee with a medium-length tongue. The head, thorax and first two segments of the abdomen are yellow while the rest of the abdomen is black. The face has a mixture of yellow and black hairs and the thorax is densely clad in shaggy yellow hair except for a smooth central portion which is bare and shiny. The first two abdominal segments bear yellow hairs and the remainder of the abdomen is clad in black hairs. The underside of this bee and the legs are black. Similar species with which it can be confused include Bombus sandersoni (which is slightly smaller), Bombus perplexus, Bombus impatiens and Bombus affinis.

Behavior
This bee comes out from hibernation quite late in the year with the first queens being seen in early May in Maine, and workers being on the wing from June to August. but in more southerly locations it may be seen a month earlier than this. The queen favors apple and plum blossom while the workers appreciate red clover, Penstemon, Asclepias (milkweed), Cirsium (thistle), Eupatorium and Spiraea (meadowsweet). Unlike most other species of bumblebee in the region, it forages in shady forest habitats. Drones are often to be seen late in the season on aster and goldenrod.

Nests are usually on the surface of the ground or in holes in the ground and at its peak, the colony may have about seventy workers. The nest is sometimes parasitized by the cuckoo bumblebee Bombus citrinus. The parasitic protozoon Apicystis bombi sometimes parasitizes this species.

References

Bumblebees
Insects described in 1854
Hymenoptera of North America
Insects of the Arctic